The Roscommon Intermediate Football Championship is an annual Gaelic Athletic Association competition between mid-tier football clubs in County Roscommon. The winning club qualifies to represent its county in the Connacht Intermediate Club Football Championship, and, in turn, goes on to the All-Ireland Intermediate Club Football Championship.

The 2021 championship was won by St Faithleach's, who defeated St Dominic's (after extra-time) by a scoreline of 1–8 to 0–7.

Qualification for subsequent competitions

Connacht Intermediate Club Football Championship
The Roscommon IFC winners qualify for the Connacht Intermediate Club Football Championship. It is the only team from County Roscommon to qualify for this competition. The Roscommon IFC winners enter the Connacht Intermediate Club Football Championship at the quarter-final stage. For example, 2021 winner St Faithleach's qualified for the Connacht final, and won the game with a last-minute goal. 2017 winner Michael Glavey's also won the Connacht final, as did 2014 winner St Croan's. That was the first time this competition's winner also won the Connacht final since Western Gaels did so in 2004.

All-Ireland Intermediate Club Football Championship
The Roscommon IFC winners — by winning the Connacht Intermediate Club Football Championship — may qualify for the All-Ireland Intermediate Club Football Championship, at which they would enter at the semi-final stage, providing they haven't been drawn to face the British champions in the quarter-finals.

Roscommon Senior Football Championship
The winning club gains promotion to the Senior Championship.

Trophy

Venue
The final is traditionally held at Dr Hyde Park.

Roll of honour

List of finals

References

External links
 Official Roscommon Website
 Roscommon on Hoganstand

Gaelic football competitions in County Roscommon
Roscommon GAA club championships